Baudet is a French surname. Notable people with the surname include:

Étienne Baudet (died 1711), French engraver
Pierre Joseph Henry Baudet (PJH Baudet; 1824-1878), Dutch historian
Jean C. Baudet (born 1944), Belgian philosopher and writer
Julien Baudet (born 1979), French footballer and manager
Thierry Baudet (born 1983), Dutch politician

French-language surnames